Kedros Ayia Marina Skylloura is a Cypriot association football club based in Agia Marina (Skylloura), located in the Nicosia District. Its colours are green and white. It has 1 participation in Cypriot Fourth Division.

References

Football clubs in Cyprus
Association football clubs established in 1967
1967 establishments in Cyprus